The Inouye Marksmanship Center is a 12,000 square foot shooting range located on the campus of The Citadel in Charleston, South Carolina.  It is home to NCAA Division I The Citadel Bulldogs rifle team, as well as the club pistol team, The Citadel's ROTC programs, and the South Carolina National Guard.  The range is named for Senator Daniel Inouye, who secured federal funding for the facility in 2002.

The facility hosted the 2017 Southern Conference rifle championships, as well as the annual Southeastern Air Rifle Conference championships from 2012–2016, and will host the 2018 NCAA Rifle Championships.

References

The Citadel Bulldogs rifle
The Citadel Bulldogs sports venues
Sports venues in Charleston, South Carolina
2006 establishments in South Carolina
Shooting ranges in the United States